is a Japanese actress and pop singer under Victor Entertainment. Her father is narrator Naochika Hayashida.

Filmography

Television Series

Film

Theatre

Discography

Albums

Singles

Video albums

References

External links 
  
 Sakurako Ohara's profile at Fuji Pacific Music Inc. 
 Sakurako Ohara's profile at Victor Entertainment 
 

1996 births
Living people
Actresses from Tokyo
Victor Entertainment artists
21st-century Japanese actresses
21st-century Japanese women singers
21st-century Japanese singers